The Castex government (French: gouvernement Castex) was the forty-second government of the French Fifth Republic, formed on 3 July 2020 and headed by Jean Castex as Prime Minister under the presidency of Emmanuel Macron. It was dissolved on 16 May 2022, after Élisabeth Borne was selected as prime minister following the re-election of Macron.

Context

Formation 

After three years with the same government, the 2020 municipal elections raised the question of a new administration and led to speculations about a governmental reshuffle. The performance of President Macron's party, La République En Marche! (LREM), at these elections strengthened the rumors. On 3 July 2020, Édouard Philippe tendered the resignation of his government to the President of the Republic. The same day, the Élysée Palace informed the press that Jean Castex, incumbent Mayor of Prades, would replace him and form a new government, the third since the election of Macron.

At the time of his appointment, Castex was very little known, only for his management of France's exit of lockdown following the COVID-19 pandemic. The composition of the government was announced on 6 July 2020 by Alexis Kohler, Secretary-General of the Élysée Palace, with a sizeable number of ministers from the previous one retained. Among the main changes, Gérald Darmanin, previously Minister for Public Accounts, replaced at the Interior Christophe Castaner who was heavily criticised by National Police's unions following accusations of violence and racism in their ranks. However, the nomination of Darmanin was met with protests by feminist movements over accusations of rape in 2009, as well as the one of Minister of Justice Éric Dupond-Moretti for his defense as lawyer of men accused of rapes.

The new cabinet also saw the return of Roselyne Bachelot, who previously served as minister under Jacques Chirac and Nicolas Sarkozy, as well as Barbara Pompili, former Secretary of State for Biodiversity under François Hollande, while main portfolios holders, such as Jean-Yves Le Drian, Jean-Michel Blanquer, Bruno Le Maire or Florence Parly remained in office.

The Prime Minister delivered his policy speech before the National Assembly and asked for its confidence on 15 July 2020; he obtained it by 345 votes out of 577.

On 26 July, the remaining state secretaries were appointed. Bruno Le Maire declared to be working at relaunching the French economy while Castex said to be ready to reopen dialogue over a controversial pension reform. A plan for a new lockdown amid the COVID-19 pandemic was also said to be ready.

Composition 
Ministers

Deputy Ministers

State Secretaries

References

French governments
Cabinets established in 2020
Emmanuel Macron
2020 establishments in France